The Showdown is a 2011 South Korean film.

Plot
In the 11th year of Gwanghaegun, Manchus invade Joseon and the Joseon soldiers decide to help Ming China fight against the Manchus. In the middle of Manchuria, three Korean soldiers who have barely survived are cornered by the Manchu forces and must fight a bloody battle.

Cast
Park Hee-soon: Heon-myung
Jin Goo: Do-young
Ko Chang-seok: Du-soo 
Kim Kap-soo: No-shin
Jang Hee-jin: Seo-hyun
Jeon Kuk-hwan: Dang-soo 
Choi Il-hwa: Do-young's father 
Lee Jong-su 
Kim Hyeong-jong 
Jung Young-ki 
Ki Se-hyung
 Kim Young-hoon as Blue army 2

References

External links
 https://web.archive.org/web/20120525045717/http://www.showdown2011.co.kr/
 
 
 

2010s historical action films
2011 films
South Korean historical action films
Films set in the Joseon dynasty
Sidus Pictures films
Films directed by Park Hoon-jung
2011 directorial debut films
2010s South Korean films